Emil Milihram (born 21 October 1982) is a Croatian male canoeist who won a world championship at senior level at the Wildwater Canoeing World Championships and twice the Wildwater Canoeing World Cup.

References

External links
 

1982 births
Living people
Croatian male canoeists